This is a timeline of the history of on-air broadcasts of teletext on television in the UK.

1980s 
 1980
 12 March – The very first in-vision Ceefax transmission is broadcast. It is shown on BBC1 between 8:30am and 9am. Later, two 30-minute broadcasts, usually aired at 10am and 3:30pm, begin on BBC2. The output showcases various aspects of the Ceefax service, with a digest of news, sport, weather, TV listings and other topics are used to help promote Ceefax and teletext in general. The broadcasts, called Ceefax in Vision, are not referred to in the Radio Times or on newspapers’ television listings pages.

 1981
 No events.

 1982
 No events.

 1983
 14 January –  Ahead of the launch of Breakfast Time, the final 8:30am 30-minute Ceefax broadcast is shown on BBC1.
 28 February  – BBC1 begins broadcasting a 30-minute Ceefax slot prior to the start of Breakfast Time. It is called Ceefax AM. It is first mentioned in the Radio Times on 21 March.
 18 March – Channel 4 broadcasts in-vision teletext pages for the first time. Two magazines are shown – 4-Tel on View and Oracle on View – and in fifteen minute bursts which are repeated several times each day prior to the start of each day's transmissions. Teletext pages are only shown on weekdays.
 2 May – From today Ceefax in Vision is broadcast during all daytime downtime although BBC2 continues to fully close down for four hours after Play School.
 19 September – The BBC's daytime education service Daytime on Two is broadcast for the first time and a special sequence of Ceefax pages, called the Daytime on Two information Service, is broadcast during the longer gaps between programmes.
 October – Ceefax in Vision is seen through the morning and into the afternoon on BBC2 at the weekend for the first time during the Open University’s off-season. They continue to be shown on weekend mornings until the end of January when the OU reopens for the new term. The only other all-morning weekend broadcast until the following October is over the Easter weekend.
 5 December – Following the end of the Daytime on Two term, Ceefax is shown non-stop throughout the day on BBC2 for the first time with transmissions running continuously from around 9am until the start of programmes at 5.35pm.
 1984
 7 January – Daytime Ceefax transmissions are renamed Pages from Ceefax following the decision by the Radio Times to begin listing daytime Ceefax broadcasts. And by now, the start time for BBC2’s Ceefax broadcasts is 9am.
 Viewers in London and the South East see a two-minute weekday mid-afternoon Ceefax broadcast. It is aired during the slot when the rest of the UK is broadcasting its afternoon regional news summary - a full regional news service for the area did not launch until the following year. The pages shown are from the Ceefax Newsreel sequence rather than the usual Ceefax miscellany.
 4–12 August – During the second week of the 1984 Summer Olympic Games, the BBC extends its live coverage until around 4am. Rather than closing down, the BBC fills the gap with Ceefax Olympics AM which provides news from the Games to fill the gap between the end of live coverage and the start of Olympic Breakfast Time. This is the first time that Ceefax pages are broadcast overnight.
 15 October – An extension of Channel 4’s broadcasting hours sees teletext transmissions broadcast earlier, running from 10am until 1:45pm (albeit with the ETP-1 testcard shown between 45 and 00 past the hour) as opposed to the previous hours of between 1pm until 4:15pm.

 1985
 7 January – Afternoon Pages from Ceefax is shown on BBC1 between the end of lunchtime programmes and the start of children's programmes for the first time and on BBC2 Ceefax pages are shown continuously between 9am and 5:25pm apart from when Daytime on Two is in season and when sporting events are being shown.
 18 February – Ceefax AM’s broadcast time is extended from 30 to 50 minutes following the retiming of Breakfast Time to a later time slot.
 28 June – The end of the 1984/85 school year sees the closure of the Daytime on Two information service as when Daytime on Two returns in September, the gaps are filled by interval captions and for breaks of more than 10 minutes, the usual Ceefax miscellany is shown.
 8 September – BBC1 shows Pages from Ceefax on Sunday mornings for the final time as from next year repeats are shown during the adult educational Sunday morning slot's Summer break.

 1986
 February – For the first time, animated graphics are seen during teletext transmissions. This is made possible by transmitting 4-Tel on View from a disc rather than live.
 2 April – The first in-vision teletext service is seen on ITV when Central launches its Jobfinder service which broadcasts for one hour after the end of the day's programming. 
 9 September – The last ever non-stop all-day BBC2 Pages from Ceefax broadcast takes place.
 14 October – BBC2 begins regular late afternoon programming by showing a film during the second half of the gap between the end of Daytime on Two and the start of the evening's programmes. Consequently, Ceefax broadcasts now end at just before 4pm.
 24 October – Ahead of the launch of the BBC's daytime television service, Pages from Ceefax is shown during BBC1's daytime downtime for the final time.
8 December – Following the launch of the BBC's daytime service, BBC2's broadcast hours are also extended. Consequently, during the school holidays, Pages from Ceefax now ends at 2pm.

 1987
 For a brief period, Oracle pages are shown prior to the start of TV-am’s programmes. The sequence is called Daybreak and mainly consists of information about TV-am. This ends when TV-am's broadcast hours increase in September.
 30 January – Yorkshire becomes the second ITV region to launch a Jobfinder service, broadcasting for an hour after closedown.
 25 April – Central becomes the first ITV station to keep its transmitters on air all night. Programmes are shown until around 3am on weekdays and 4am at the weekend, with the rest of the night filled by its Jobfinder service. with Tyne Tees doing the same from November 1987. 
 May–August – Pages from Ceefax broadcasts are extended by an hour and run until 3pm in the absence of any other programming.
 12 June – On the morning after the 1987 United Kingdom general election, BBC2 broadcasts a Ceefax Results Service, running from 7:20am until the start of Daytime on Two at 10:04am.
 14 September – 
ITV Schools programmes transfer to Channel 4 resulting in an expansion of the channel's weekday broadcasting hours. Consequently, teletext pages move to an earlier slot, beginning at 8am and running to 9:28am during the term and until 11:45am during school holidays.
The content of Oracle on View changes from focussing on one aspect of the ORACLE output to being a news service.
 11 October – Sunday Ceefax transmissions all-but end following the decision to launch a new children's strand Now on Two during the Open University off-season, Consequently, just a few minutes of Ceefax pages are now broadcast on Sunday mornings. On Saturdays, Ceefax continues to air throughout the morning, generally until around midday.

 1988
 The Summer Daytime on Two break sees the return of the post lunchtime Children's BBC Ceefax broadcast but it's only a 25-minute transmission as full afternoon programmes during the Summer of 1988 begin at 2pm.
 18 August – The level 2 in-vision generator is used for Pages from Ceefax broadcasts for the first time. However these broadcasts are mainly confined to BBC1 from 1990 until 1994.
 The commencement of 24-hour broadcasting on ITV sees many regions launching a teletext Jobfinder service as part of their overnight offering with almost all ITV regions using Level 2 teletext graphics.
 October to January 1989 – As with last year, on Saturdays, Ceefax continues to air throughout the morning and on Sundays just a few minutes of Ceefax pages are shown due to Now on Two being broadcast on Sundays during the Open University off-season. This is the final time that Ceefax is used as the programme filler during the Open University's annual break.
 By the end of 1988, all ITV regions are broadcasting a 24-hour service and many regions introduce a Jobfinder service which is shown on weekdays between 4am and 5am.

 1989
 31 March – The last Oracle on View transmission takes place.
 3 April – Channel 4 launches its breakfast television service The Channel Four Daily and from this date, 4-Tel on View is shown in a single 40-minute block rather than in 15 minute bursts. It is also shown at the weekend for the first time.
 16 June – Pages from Ceefax is shown after 10am for the final time as from Monday 19th, BBC2 begins broadcasting programmes when Daytime on Two is not on air at 10am rather than at lunchtime.
 15 September – Ceefax AM is broadcast for the final time.
 20 November – The Ceefax service is revamped to focus mainly on news. Consequently, the in-vision sequence changes dramatically. Gone are the magazine elements with Pages from Ceefax now consisting of a 13-page 'Newsreel' with the 14th page being a title page although a weather map and forecast is shown initially before being removed in early 1990.
22 November – Following the commencement of televised coverage of the House of Commons the previous day, BBC2 launches a breakfast round-up of yesterday's proceedings. This is preceded by the 8am bulletin from Breakfast News. This results in the very first peak-breakfast Pages from Ceefax broadcast with Ceefax shown for around 30 minutes prior to the 8am news bulletin.

1990s 
 1990
 2 January – The 30-minute weekday 6am Ceefax slot returns to BBC1 but the content is the same as for all other Ceefax broadcasts and therefore is listed in the same way, as Pages from Ceefax.
 April – Pages from Ceefax is broadcast after 9am for the final time.

 1991
 17 January – During the early stages of the Gulf War, BBC1 keeps its transmitters on air overnight to bring viewers the latest information, and uses Ceefax pages to provide that overnight service.

 1992
 16 November – Following the relaunch of the Ceefax service, the content seen on Pages from Ceefax is increased. The number of pages is more than doubled and the end of the sequence sees the introduction of headline pages for finance, sport and the weather maps and forecast and occasionally travel news. The age number for the in-vision service changes for the first time, moving from 198 to 196.

 1993
 4 January – BBC1 begins broadcasting on weekdays at 6am. A start of day Ceefax broadcast is retained although it now runs for 15 minutes rather than 30.
 Channel 4 starts broadcasting 4-Tel on View during its overnight closedowns.
 April – A weekend 7am Ceefax broadcast begins on BBC1 and is formally mentioned in TV listings. This continues until later in the year when 7am programmes start being introduced.

 1994
 February – Level 2 teletext graphics are used for the first time. Their introduction coincides with a major change to the in-vision service which sees a significant expansion to the number of pages shown. Rather than just a headline page, sports news items return alongside several pages of financial prices and several pages of travel news. TV listings for all four channels are also shown. In addition, title pages for each section return. However, the new expanded Pages from Ceefax broadcasts are confined to the 15 minutes prior to the start of programmes, which often isn't sufficient time to show the entire sequence which is now between 40 and 50 pages in length.

 1995
 16 October – BBC Learning Zone launches and Pages from Ceefax is broadcast in the gaps between the end of regular programmes and the start of Learning Zone broadcasts. This is the first time that Ceefax is broadcast overnight on a regular basis.

 1996
 March – Pages from Ceefax returns to the Level 1 broadcasting format.
 16 November – A major shake-up of the Ceefax service sees the in-vision sequence change back to a sequence of news pages which are fronted by headline pages for news, finance, sport and travel. The number of pages shown is halved and the title pages are removed. The page number also changes, from 196 to 152. Also, the top line is removed from the in-vision broadcasts.

 1997
 6 January – Channel 4 starts 24-hour broadcasting, resulting in the end of 4-Tel on View. 
 9 November – Pages from Ceefax is broadcast on BBC1 for the final time as from the following day, all overnight downtime is replaced by an overnight simulcast of BBC News 24 which launches on this day.

 1998
 14 January – ITV Nightscreen launches as an overnight filler on ITV. Broadcast as teletext pages, the service features news and information about ITV and its programmes.

 1999
 In mid 1999, the top line is restored to Pages from Ceefax.

2000s and 2010s 
 2000
 No events.

 2001
 No events.

 2002
 After six years, the weather maps are reintroduced to Pages from Ceefax broadcasts.

 2003
 Teletext pages are no longer used for ITV Nightscreen when the format of the pages is transferred to a format using Scala InfoChannel3.

 2004
 A reduction in airtime for BBC Learning Zone means that more airtime is given over to Pages from Ceefax.

2005 
 5 October – A 6am to 7am broadcast of Pages from Ceefax is introduced as a replacement for the 6am CBeebies programming block.

2006 
 22 December – The breakfast Ceefax broadcasts end ahead of the return of the 6am CBeebies hour.

2007 to 2011 
 No specific events but this period sees a significant amount of airtime given over to Pages from Ceefax, especially at the weekend, with some transmissions running for as long as five hours. They are broadcast from the end of BBC Two's BBC News 24 simulcast until the start of children's programmes at 6am.

2012
22 October – At 5:59am the final transmission of Pages from Ceefax comes to an end with special continuity announcements and a specially created end caption featuring various Ceefax graphics from over the years.

See also
 Timeline of teletext in the UK

References

teletext on UK television
teletext on UK television
teletext on UK television
Teletext